The Dirección Federal de Seguridad (Federal Security Directorate, DFS) was a Mexican intelligence agency and secret police. It was created in 1947 under Mexican president Miguel Alemán Valdés with the assistance of U.S. intelligence agencies (namely the CIA) as part of the Truman Doctrine of Soviet Containment, with the duty of "preserving the internal stability of Mexico against all forms subversion and terrorist threats". It was merged into the Centro de Investigación y Seguridad Nacional (CISEN) in 1985.

During the period from 1968 to the late 1970s (a period called the Mexican Dirty War), the DFS was accused of illegal detentions, torture, assassinations and forced disappearances. At least 347 complaints were received by the United Nations related to Mexican state crimes from 1960 to 1980.

The agency was highly successful in thwarting and deterring any attempt by anti-government or pro-Soviet organizations to destabilize the country. However, it was a notoriously controversial government entity, and it was disbanded under the presidency of Miguel de la Madrid by the hand of his secretary of the interior Manuel Bartlett Díaz in 1985. Multiple agents were suspected (and later confirmed) of having links with criminal organizations, which included top members like Miguel Nazar Haro and Arturo "El Negro" Durazo Moreno. Other infamous former agents includes Rafael Aguilar Guajardo founding member of the Juárez Cartel and Juan José Esparragoza Moreno, who became one of the leaders of the Sinaloa Cartel, which in 2021 was named as the most powerful drug trafficking organization in the world.

Some such criminal exploits included a million dollar US-Mexico car theft ring, collaborating in drug trafficking with the Guadalajara Cartel (including the protection of the infamous "Colonia Bufalo" marijuana crops), training the Nicaraguan contras in drug trafficker owned ranches, the murder of journalist Manuel Buendia, for investigating ties between the DFS, the CIA and drug traffickers, and for having some degree of participation in, and providing cover to, the kidnapping and subsequent death of DEA agent Enrique Camarena Salazar.

Heads of the DFS
 (1947–1952) Gen. Marcelino Inurreta
 (1952–1958) Col. Leandro Castillo-Venegas
 (1958–1959) LLB. Gilberto Suárez-Torres .
 (1959–1964) Col. Manuel Rangel-Escamilla
 (1965–1970) Cap. Fernando Gutiérrez Barrios
 (1970–1977) Cap. Luis de la Barreda
 (1977–1978) Mr. Javier García Paniagua 
 (1978–1982) Lt.Col. Miguel Nazar Haro 
 (1982–1985) LLB. José-Antonio Zorrilla 
 (1985) Cap. Pablo González-Ruelas

Notorious members 
 Rafael Aguilar Guajardo
 Arturo Durazo Moreno (Alias "El Negro Durazo")
 Juan José Esparragoza Moreno (Alias "El Azul")

See also 
 CIA cryptonym

References 

1947 establishments in Mexico
Government agencies of Mexico
1985 disestablishments in Mexico
Defunct intelligence agencies
Secret police
Defunct law enforcement agencies of Mexico
Cold War organizations
Cold War in Latin America
Foreign relations of Mexico
National security institutions
Anti-communism in Mexico
Human rights abuses in Mexico
Mexican intelligence agencies
Anti-communist organizations
Military history of Mexico
Political movements in Mexico
Espionage
Socialism in Mexico
Communism in Mexico
Government of Mexico
Mexican drug war